Karlskirche is a baroque church in Vienna, Austria.

Karlskirche may also refer to:

 Karlskirche (Kassel), Protestant church in northern Hesse, Germany
 Karlskirche (Zweibrücken), church in Rhineland-Palatinate, Germany

See also 
 St. Charles' Church (disambiguation)
 Charles Borromeo Church (disambiguation)